This is a list of UCF Knights baseball seasons. The UCF Knights baseball team competes in the National Collegiate Athletics Association (NCAA) and are a member of the American Athletic Conference (The American). The Knights play their home games at John Euliano Park, which is located on the main campus of UCF in Orlando, Florida.

From 1963 to 1978, the University of Central Florida (UCF) was known as Florida Technological University (FTU). The University of Central Florida first fielded a varsity baseball team in fall 1970 under Jack Pantelias. Known as the FTU Goldsox, they played in the Amateur Baseball League of Central Florida until the team joined the NCAA for the 1973 season under head coach Doug Holmquist. The Knights ascended to Division I in 1985 under Jay Bergman.

Since its first NCAA season in 1973, the Knights have won seven conference championships and appeared in the NCAA Tournament twelve times.

Season results

Notes

Sources:

References

External links

 

 
Ucf Knights
UCF Knights baseball seasons